Bob Babich may refer to:

Bob Babich (American football coach) (born 1961), American football coach
Bob Babich (linebacker) (born 1947), American football player